Nicole Rancourt is a Canadian politician who served in the Legislative Assembly of Saskatchewan from 2016 to 2020, representing the riding of Prince Albert Northcote. She was elected in the 2016 provincial election as a member of the Saskatchewan New Democratic Party. She defeated Saskatchewan Party incumbent Victoria Jurgens with a majority of 232 votes.

Electoral history

2016 Saskatchewan general election

References

Living people
Saskatchewan New Democratic Party MLAs
Women MLAs in Saskatchewan
Politicians from Prince Albert, Saskatchewan
21st-century Canadian women politicians
Year of birth missing (living people)